Leucotmemis torrida is a moth of the subfamily Arctiinae. It was described by Francis Walker in 1854. It is found in Brazil.

References

 

Leucotmemis
Moths described in 1854